Roots (stylized as ROOTS) is the debut studio album by Nigerian highlife band The Cavemen. It was written, vocalised and produced by the duo, with fellow Nigerian singer Lady Donli serving as the executive producer and released under Freeme Music, a Nigerian indigenous record label . It was released on 21 August 2020.

Background 
The Cavemen worked on Roots for about 2 years before its eventual release in 2020. They album is described as being reverent to their Nigerian heritage and the music genre which reigned supreme In the country's trying times. The album art which was made with green tones is also said to represent "community". The album was recorded in their living room. 

It is a 16-track album. The opening song, "Welcome to the Cave" serves as an introduction to the album as a whole.

Production and release 
The album was produced by The Cavemen and Lady Donli served as the executive producer. It was recorded in the Cavemen's living room and  released on 21 August 2020 under the FreeMe Music label following 2 years of work. It was recorded in Pidgin English and Igbo Language.

Reception 
A review by Nativemag said "the Cavemen seem to have achieved what they set out for... the 54 minutes-long set is packed with bewitching, colourful and easy listening grooves, resulting in an album that flows immaculately from front to back and favours repeat listens. In a review for Pulse Nigeria, Motolani Alake said "The sound of the album carries on the tradition of their musical ancestors, exploring the beauty that can be found in this pillar of Nigerian and African culture. This is an exploration of highlife in its full sense, with each track containing something new for listeners to take away." Dami Ajayi of The Africa Report described the album as "the most accomplished resurgence that highlife has enjoyed since Flavour N'bania sampled Rex Lawson."

Charts

Awards

References 

Highlife albums by Nigerian artists
2020 albums
Igbo-language albums
2020 in Nigeria
The Headies winners